Samaras (feminine: Samara) is a Greek surname meaning 'saddler'. Notable people with the surname include: 

 Antonis Samaras (born 1951), Greek politician; Prime Minister of Greece, 2012-15
 Georgios Samaras (born 1985), Greek footballer
 Ioannis Samaras (born 1961), Greek footballer
 Katherine Samaras, Australian endocrinologist
 Lucas Samaras (born 1936), Greek-American art photographer
 Nikos Samaras (1970–2013), Greek volleyball player
 Nick Samaras, American poet
 Spyridon Samaras (1861–1917), Greek composer
 Tim Samaras (1957–2013), American weather researcher and "storm chaser"
 William F.G Samaras (1988), Greek-American Born in Porterville ca, former Tattoo Artist & Piercer For Mooney ink, in Visalia ca, 
Owner of Sling'emInk & Motorcycle enthusiast & President Of CWA MAFIA F.C.R.C Fight & Riding Club
Est.2000 Based In Porterville Ca
Netflix film "strange magic" his face was used to play "Sunny"

See also
Samara (disambiguation)

Greek-language surnames
Surnames